Wesley "Wes" Wessberg (born June 27, 1939) is an American former cyclist. He competed in the individual road race at the 1968 Summer Olympics. After high school, Wessberg joined the Air Force. He later graduated from Cal State Northridge with a degree in physics.

References

External links
 

1939 births
Living people
American male cyclists
Olympic cyclists of the United States
Cyclists at the 1968 Summer Olympics
Sportspeople from Washington, D.C.